Gaoussou Traoré (born 4 December 1999) is a French professional footballer who plays as a midfielder for  club Concarneau, on loan from Amiens.

Club career 
Traoré is a youth product of Amiens SC, joining their academy from his local side RC Amiénois. On 19 February 2018, Traoré signed a one-year trainee contract with the club. He made his professional debut for Amiens in a 2–0 Ligue 1 loss to Olympique Lyonnais on 12 August 2018.

On 18 June 2019, Traoré was loaned out to US Quevilly-Rouen for the 2019–20 season. On 30 June 2022, he was loaned to Concarneau.

Personal life 
Traoré was born in France and is of Malian descent.

References

External links 
 

1999 births
Living people
Sportspeople from Amiens
Footballers from Hauts-de-France
French footballers
French sportspeople of Malian descent
Association football midfielders
Ligue 1 players
Ligue 2 players
Championnat National players
Championnat National 3 players
Amiens SC players
US Quevilly-Rouen Métropole players
US Concarneau players